Tallahassee National Cemetery is a  National Cemetery located in Tallahassee in Leon County, Florida. The cemetery is administered by the United States Department of Veterans Affairs.

History 
The Veterans Administration purchased the 250-acre parcel of land in August 2012 for $6.8 million. On May 22, 2015, Tallahassee National Cemetery was dedicated. The cemetery is designed to accommodate the burials of over 83,000 veterans from Leon County and the surrounding area.

References

External links 
 National Cemetery Administration
 Tallahassee National Cemetery
 
 

2015 establishments in Florida
Cemeteries in Florida
United States national cemeteries
Tallahassee, Florida